Andrew J. Borsa (1944 – March 7, 2016) was a member of the New Hampshire House of Representatives. He was first elected in 1992 to represent Pelham. Borsa was elected as a member of the Libertarian Party.

See also

 Libertarian Party of New Hampshire

References

Libertarian Party (United States) officeholders
New Hampshire Libertarians
Members of the New Hampshire House of Representatives
People from Pelham, New Hampshire
1944 births
2016 deaths